The Nakaway Ahkeeng Reserve is an Indian reserve of the Yellow Quill First Nation in Saskatchewan. It is in the city of Saskatoon.

References

Indian reserves in Saskatchewan
Urban Indian reserves in Canada